Swathi is an Indian Telugu-language weekly women's magazine launched in 1984. It is founded by Vemuri Balaram, who also edited it. It is the largest circulated Telugu weekly magazine. It is published by Swathi Publications with its headquarters in Vijayawada.

History and profile
The magazine was launched in 1984 by Vemuri Balaram, who also edited it. The publisher is Swathi Publications and its headquarters is in Vijayawada. It is the largest circulated Telugu weekly magazine.

References

External links
 Swathi weekly magazine

1970 establishments in Andhra Pradesh
Magazines established in 1970
Weekly magazines published in India
Women's magazines published in India

Telugu-language magazines
Mass media in Andhra Pradesh